This is a list of aircraft sorted by maximum takeoff weight.

Airplanes
MTOW = Maximum take-off weight, MLW = Maximum landing weight, TOR = Take-off run (SL, ISA+15°, MTOW), LR = Landing run (SL, ISA+15°, MLW)

Helicopters
MTOW = Maximum take-off weight

Convertiplanes
MTOW = Maximum take-off weight

See also
Wide-body aircraft

References

Maximum Takeoff Weight